In the Future is the second album by Black Mountain, which was released January 21, 2008.  It follows their eponymous debut album which was released in 2005.  A "limited edition" of the album was released on the same day with 3 bonus tracks on a second disc. It debuted on the UK Album Chart at #72.

The album art was designed by keyboardist Jeremy Schmidt, who was influenced by Storm Thorgerson's work.

The album was a nominee for the 2008 Polaris Music Prize.

Franz Nicolay, of The Hold Steady, listed the album as one of his favourite releases in 2008.

Track listing
All songs written by Stephen McBean, except where noted.
 "Stormy High" - 4:32
 "Angels" - 3:07
 "Tyrants" - 8:00
 "Wucan" - 6:01
 "Stay Free" - 4:29
 "Queens Will Play" - 5:15
 "Evil Ways" - 3:25
 "Wild Wind" - 1:42
 "Bright Lights" - 16:37
 "Night Walks" (Amber Webber) - 3:55

Disc 2 (Limited Edition version only)
 "Bastards of Light" - 5:09
 "Thirteen Walls" - 7:06
 "Black Cat" - 2:51

Usage in other media
"Stay Free" was used in both the second season of Showtime's Californication on the episode "Going Down and Out in Beverly Hills", and the film Spider-Man 3 (it was included on the soundtrack album, which was released on May 1, 2007, eight months before the release of "In The Future").
"Stormy High" was used in the 2012 videogame Spec Ops: The Line.

References

2008 albums
Black Mountain (band) albums
Jagjaguwar albums